In mathematics, class number may refer to

 Class number (group theory), in group theory, is the number of conjugacy classes of a group
 Class number (number theory), the size of the ideal class group of a number ring
 Class number (binary quadratic forms), the number of equivalence classes of binary quadratic forms of a given discriminant